In aviation training, a view-limiting device simulates instrument meteorological conditions (IMC) by restricting a pilot's field of view only to the flight instruments. They are worn by pilots who are working toward an instrument rating, which allows a pilot to fly under instrument flight rules in conditions that do not permit visual flight. They are also used by instrument-rated pilots while practicing instrument flight to maintain competency.

Examples include foggles and the IFR hood. Foggles are glasses that have been frosted on the top half of the lenses to simulate foggy conditions.

See also
 Safety pilot
 FAA Practical Test

References

Flight training